Little Cultus Lake is a natural lake in Deschutes County, Oregon, United States. Near its larger and more popular twin Cultus Lake to the north on the other side of Cultus Mountain, it is located in the Deschutes National Forest in the Cascade Range. Like Cultus Lake, it is named after the Chinook Jargon word "cultus", meaning "in vain" or "worthless".

Location
It is located off of the Cascade Lakes Scenic Byway, which winds through the terrain featuring similar natural lakes.

Activities
Little Cultus Lake is known for its fishing of Rainbow trout and brook trout, the latter of which was stocked by the Oregon Department of Fish and Wildlife until in 1997. Fly fishing, bank fishing, and trolling are the most common fishing methods on the lake. Since the brook trout are no longer stocked, they are a bit more rare than the rainbows.

Little Cultus Lake has a campground with 31 campsites, as well as a paved boat launch. It is located toward the southeast side of the lake.

This also makes fishing in the lake available to people in kayaks or float tubes.

See also
 List of lakes in Oregon

References

Lakes of Deschutes County, Oregon
Chinook Jargon place names
Lakes of Oregon
Deschutes National Forest
Protected areas of Deschutes County, Oregon